Por Aquelas Que Foram Bem Amadas (also Pra Não Dizer Que Não Falei de Rock) is the seventh solo album by Brazilian singer/guitarist Zé Ramalho. It was released in 1984.

In the cover of the album, Ramalho appears without his characteristic beard, lying on the arms of Marelise, daughter of Brazilian film director Zé do Caixão, who had also directed the cover art of Por Aquelas Que Foram Bem Amadas. A boa named Rita also guest appears in the cover. She had worked in films such as Luz del Fuego.

Track listing

References 

1984 albums
Zé Ramalho albums
Epic Records albums